Gina Jane Choi (born September 13, 1987), better known by her stage name G.NA, is a Korean Canadian singer, songwriter and actress based in South Korea. She released her debut EP, Draw G's First Breath, on July 14, 2010.

As a solo artist, she released one studio album, four extended plays, fifteen singles (including seven as a featured artist). She also released six OST soundtrack appearances.

History

Gina Jane Choi was born on September 13, 1987, in Edmonton, Alberta, Canada. She graduated from Fraser Heights Secondary School in Surrey, British Columbia. G.NA was originally set to debut as the leader of girl group Five Girls under Good Entertainment. However, the group disbanded shortly before their scheduled debut in 2007 due to Good Entertainment's financial troubles and the members all left for separate Korean entertainment agencies; Choi joined Cube Entertainment.

G.NA released a duet with Rain, "Aeini Saenggimyeon Hago Sipeun Il" ("Things I Want to Do When I Have a Lover", 애인이 생기면 하고 싶은 일), on July 5, 2010. Her debut EP, Draw G's First Breath, was released the same year. In February 2011, she released her debut studio album Black & White, which gained her success and sold more copies. and she sang on Hyuna's album Bubble Pop! in the song "A Bitter Day".

Her third EP, Bloom, was released on May 22, 2012, with the lead single "2HOT". In October, she released Oui, comprising English versions of her previous hit songs. Beautiful Kisses was released in March 2013.

G.NA collaborated with Aaron Yan for his song "Half (1/2)", for the drama series Fall in Love with Me, and was in a variety show, Real Man.

In 2015 she debuted in the idol sub-unit Chamsonyeo, a group produced in the TV program Hitmaker produced by Defconn and Jeong Hyeong-don.

On February 1, 2016, G.NA was involved in a prostitution scandal, where she was accused of being paid 35 million won ($30,000 USD) by an unidentified businessman for sex. G.NA denied this accusation and explained that a male friend, whom she later learned was a "broker for high-end prostitution", had lent her money during her financial troubles and asked her to meet his businessman friend, intending the two to have sex for having lent her money, whereas she had believed the meeting with the businessman to be "romantic" in nature. She was ultimately charged with prostitution and ordered to pay a fine of 2 million won. Later that month, it was revealed that her contract expired in March and she would be leaving her agency. She has left her entertainment career in an indefinite hiatus.

Discography

Studio albums

Extended plays

Singles

Other charted songs

Soundtrack appearances

Filmography

Television drama

Variety show

Music video appearances

Awards

Mnet Asian Music Awards 

|-
| 2010
| "꺼져 줄게 잘 살아""I'll Back Off So You Can Live Better (feat. Jun Hyung)"
| Best New Female Artist
| 
|-
| rowspan="2"| 2011
| rowspan="2"| "Black & White"
| Best Female
| 
|-
| Best Dance Performance
| 
|-
| rowspan="2"| 2012
| rowspan="2"| "2HOT"
| Best Female Artist - Solo
| 
|-
|  Best Dance Performance
| 
|-
|2013
| "Oops!"
| Best Dance Performance - Female Solo
|

References

External links

 

1987 births
Living people
Actresses from British Columbia
Actresses from Edmonton
Canadian actresses of Korean descent
Canadian dance musicians
Canadian expatriates in South Korea
Canadian film actresses
Canadian musicians of Korean descent
Canadian contemporary R&B singers
Canadian sopranos
Canadian television actresses
Canadian television hosts
Cube Entertainment artists
Korean-language singers of Canada
K-pop singers
Musicians from British Columbia
Musicians from Edmonton
People from Surrey, British Columbia
South Korean female idols
Canadian women pop singers
21st-century Canadian women singers
Canadian women television hosts